Vanuatu has been divided into six provinces since 1994. The names in English of all provinces are derived from the initial letters of their constituent islands:

Municipalities 

The provinces are in turn divided into municipalities  headed by a council and a mayor elected from among the members of the council.

In the Tafea Province for example are the following municipalities (council areas):
North Erromango
South Erromango
North Tanna
West Tanna
Middle Bush Tanna
Whitesands
South West Tanna
South Tanna

The islands of Aniwa, Futuna and Aneityum appear to consist of one municipality each.

Island regions (historical) 
From 1985 to 1994 it was divided into eleven island regions:

Districts (historical) 
During the Condominium era, specifically from 1968 to 1984 the group was divided into four administrative districts:

Districts (1950) 
In the 1950s, districts appeared to denote the finest administrative level, finer than the current municipalities or council areas, but above the village level. The island of Tanna was subdivided into 12 such districts, in 1952:
District Sud (ou de Kwamera)
District de Green PointDistrict Sud-Ouest
District de Lenakel
District Nord-Ouest
District de Green Hill et de Launalang
District du Centre Nord
District du Centre Brousse
District de Loanvialu
District de Waesisi
District de White Sands

See also
ISO 3166-2:VU

References

External links
 

 
Subdivisions of Vanuatu
Vanuatu, Provinces
Vanuatu 1
Provinces, Vanuatu
Vanuatu geography-related lists